Thomas Henry Burn (19 January 1875 – 1933) was an Ulster Unionist member of the UK Parliament and the Parliament of Northern Ireland. He represented Belfast St Anne's in the former from 1918 to 1922, and Belfast West in the latter from 1921 to 1929.

He was born at 21 Wesley Street, Belfast on 19 January 1875 and was the son of linen worker Thomas Henry Burn and Agnes Cassidy. 

He was Assistant Parliamentary Secretary at the Ministry of Finance and Assistant Whip from 1921 until 1925.

References

External links

1875 births
1933 deaths
Ulster Unionist Party members of the House of Commons of Northern Ireland
Members of the Parliament of the United Kingdom for Belfast constituencies (1801–1922)
UK MPs 1918–1922
Members of the House of Commons of Northern Ireland 1921–1925
Members of the House of Commons of Northern Ireland 1925–1929
Northern Ireland junior government ministers (Parliament of Northern Ireland)
Members of the House of Commons of Northern Ireland for Belfast constituencies